Khemka is a surname. Notable people with the surname include:

 Asha Khemka (born 1951), British educator
 Ashok Khemka (born 1965), Indian administrator
 Prashant Khemka (born 1971), businessman and investor
 Uday Khemka, Indian Angel investor, entrepreneur, privileged royal, and philanthropist

Surnames of Indian origin